La Cleopatra is an epic poem in 13 songs by Girolamo Graziani (1604–1674). The work was very successful at the time and was praised by many famous writers, including Fulvio Testi.

The Plot 
It deals with the story of love and war of Cleopatra and Mark Antony.
It is full of pathetic-sentimental scenes that drag towards 
the end granted with the final double suicide (Cleopatra commits suicide, after witnessing the suicide of Mark Antony).

Curiosity 
It contains a prophecy in which Proteus vaticinates the Este's Kinship from Augustus.

Editions 
 Venice, Sarzina, 1632
 Venice, 1633
 Bologna, Per Carlo Zenero, 1652
 Venice, Francesco Brogiollo, 1670

Bibliography 
 Camillo Marchesini, Vita del Conte Girolamo Gratiani,  now in: Giulio Bertoni, Vita del Conte Girolamo Graziani scritta da Camillo Marchesini, "Studi e documenti", vol. 1, fasc. II, (sept. 1937-XV), pages 131-5.
 Girolamo Tiraboschi, Biblioteca Modenese, Modena, Soliani, 1783, tomo III, pagg. 12-22.

Notes

External links 
Treccani on line (It), ad vocem,

Italian poems
1632 works
Romance (genre)